Kappa Phi Lambda was an American collegiate fraternity.  It was founded on August 3, 1862 at Jefferson College in Canonsburg, Pennsylvania (now Washington & Jefferson College).  The founder was Jacob Janeway Belville.

The fraternity's official badge consisted of a shield, with a balance, a sunburst, a mountain, and a pennant bearing the fraternity's letters.

Chapters existed at Mount Union College, University of Michigan, Monmouth College, Northwestern University, Moore's Hill, Ohio Wesleyan University, University of Virginia, Denison University, Westminster College (Pennsylvania), Western University of Pennsylvania.  A national Kappa Phi Lambda convention was held in Philadelphia in 1867.  Following that convention, the Denison University chapter became disenchanted with the authoritarianism of the national leadership and joined the Beta Theta Pi.

Following dissolution in 1874, the Mount Union College chapter joined Delta Tau Delta, the University of Michigan chapter joined Psi Upsilon, and the Northwestern University chapter joined Sigma Chi.

The last known chapter of Kappa Phi Lambda was at Westminster College (Pennsylvania). It operated sub-rosa until 1920, and petitioned Phi Gamma Delta. In 1948, it became the Epsilon Pi chapter of Sigma Nu.

Kappa Phi Lambda is considered one of the members of the "Jefferson Triad" of fraternities founded at Jefferson College, with the other two being Phi Gamma Delta and Phi Kappa Psi.  However, with the demise of Kappa Phi Lambda, the remaining two fraternities are known as the Jefferson Duo.

Notable alumni include Robert M. Nevin, a Congressman from Ohio, who was known to wear his Kappa Phi Lambda pin.

Chapter list
These are the known chapters of Kappa Phi Lambda Fraternity.  Chapter names are conjectural, from the order in Baird's Manual.  The fraternity is dormant, while some chapters lived on as part of other fraternities.

References

Student organizations established in 1862
1874 disestablishments
Student societies in the United States
Defunct fraternities and sororities
1862 establishments in Pennsylvania